Bakalia is a thana of Chattogram District in Chattogram Division, Bangladesh. Bakalia thana with an area of 12.33 km2 is located in between 22°26' and 22°19' north latitudes and in between 91°50' and 91°54' east longitudes. It is bounded by Chandgaon Thana on the north, Karnaphuli Upazila and Karnaphuli river on the east and on the south, and Chattogram Kotwali Thana on the west.

Education

Bakalia Government College is recently established as a government college in 2016.

According to Banglapedia, Bakalia Government Laboratory School is a notable secondary school.

See also 
 Upazilas of Bangladesh
 Districts of Bangladesh
 Divisions of Bangladesh

References 

Thanas of Chittagong District